Bastard cabbage is a common name for several plants and may refer to:

Rapistrum species, especially
 Rapistrum rugosum, native to Eurasia and parts of Africa
Andira inermis, the bastard cabbage tree